Samaon Sulaiman was a Filipino musician who is a recipient of the National Living Treasure award. The Maguindanaon is known for his mastery of the indigenous kutyapi instrument.

Born on 3 March 1953, Sulaiman first learned playing kutyapi at around 13 years old from his uncle. By the time he was 35 years old, he was already recognized in Maganoy for his skills in playing the instrument as well as being a teacher to aspiring kutyapi practitioners. He is credited for influencing other local experts in his area such as Esmael Ahmad, Bitul Sulaiman, Nguda Latip, Ali Ahmad and Tukal Nanalon. Sulaiman also plays the kulintang, agong (suspended bossed gong with wide rim), gandingan, palendag, and the tambul.

He was also a barber, as well as an imam at the Libutan mosque. He died on 21 May 2011.

References

1953 births
2011 deaths
Filipino musicians
Filipino Muslims
People from Maguindanao
National Living Treasures of the Philippines